Alan Reid (born 7 August 1954, Ayr, Scotland) is a Scottish Liberal Democrat politician who has been a councillor in the East Dunbartonshire ward of Bearsden North since 2022.

He was previously the Member of Parliament (MP) for Argyll and Bute from 2001 to 2015, when he lost his seat to the Scottish National Party (SNP) at the 2015 general election. He was first elected at the 2001 general election.

Background
Reid was educated at Ayr Academy and the University of Strathclyde where he gained a BSc in Mathematics.  Prior to his election to the House of Commons he worked for the University of Glasgow as a computer project manager.

He remains a member of the AUT (Association of University Teachers). He was a councillor on Renfrew District Council from 1988 to 1996.

Parliamentary career
Reid contested Paisley South in a 1990 by-election and the 1992 general election and Dumbarton in 1997, before being elected for Argyll and Bute in 2001.

In the 2010 Parliament, he served on the Scottish Affairs Committee. In the previous Parliament he was the Liberal Democrat spokesman for Northern Ireland Office and Scotland Office matters. He has also served as a Liberal Democrat whip.

During the MPs expenses scandal, The Daily Telegraph drew attention to Reid's claims of over £1500 for stays in B&B's within his own constituency. Reid argued overnight stays were necessary where ferry timetables made it impossible to return to his constituency home, and said he had successfully challenged initially rejected expense claims by explaining the geography of Argyll and Bute.

Reid unsuccessfully stood as the Liberal Democrat candidate in his former seat of Argyll and Bute at the 2017 and 2019 general elections as well as for the corresponding seat of the same name at the 2016 Scottish Parliamentary elections.

He was the lead list candidate in the Highlands and Islands electoral region for the 2021 Scottish Parliamentary elections as well as being the constituency candidate for Argyll and Bute.

East Dunbartonshire Council
For the 2022 Scottish local elections, Reid was announced as a candidate for Bearsden North in East Dunbartonshire. On 6 May 2022, he was elected alongside Calum Smith of the SNP and independent candidate Duncan Cumming.

References

External links 
 Alan Reid MP official constituency website
Alan Reid UK Parliament
 Argyll and Bute Liberal Democrats

 Alan Reid MP  at BBC News Democracy Live

1954 births
Living people
People from Ayr
People educated at Ayr Academy
Alumni of the University of Strathclyde
Scottish Liberal Democrat MPs
UK MPs 2001–2005
UK MPs 2005–2010
UK MPs 2010–2015
Scottish Liberal Democrat councillors
Councillors in Renfrewshire